Enderûn (from Persian andarûn, "inside") was the term used in the Ottoman Empire to designate the "Interior Service" of the Imperial Court, concerned with the private service of the Ottoman Sultans, as opposed to the state-administrative "Exterior Service" (Birûn). Its name derives from the location of the Sultan's apartments in the inner courts of the Topkapi Palace; its head was the Kapi Agha.

The Inner Service was divided into four departments. In descending order of importance, these were the Privy Chamber (Hass Oda), the Treasury (Hazine), the Privy Larder (Kilar-ı Hass), and the Great and Little Chambers (Büyük ve Küçük Odalar). Among the responsibilities of the Inner Service was also the running of the palace school, where Princes along with selected young Christian boys, gathered through the devşirme system (from the 17th century, however, Muslim boys were also admitted) were trained for the highest state offices. These boys served then as pages in the Inner Service, and were known as içoğlanı ("lads of the interior").

The Inner Service was also notable for its employment of deaf-mutes (dilsiz), at least from the time of Mehmed II, to the end of the empire. They acted as guards and attendants, and due to their particular nature were often entrusted with highly confidential assignments, including executions. Their number varied but they were never numerous; they had their own uniforms, their own superiors (başdilsiz), and although many were literate, they also communicated in their own special sign language.

References

Sources
 
 
 
 

Ottoman court
Topkapı Palace